Ren Erin Gill (born 29 March 1990), known professionally as Ren, is a Welsh musician, singer-songwriter, rapper, poet, producer, busker, and multi-instrumentalist. He was a member of the indie hip-hop band Trick The Fox and The Big Push, a British busking band based in Brighton. He has collaborated with Sam Tompkins, Eden Nash, and CHINCHILLA.

Ren is an independent artist. In 2022, Ren released "Hi Ren". The video went viral and appeared in both the United Kingdom and Worldwide Trending Music Video Charts on YouTube, and had 6.8 million views in two months. The next two songs Ren released, "Sick Boi" and "Bittersweet Symphony (The Verve Retake)", also appeared in the United Kingdom's Trending Music Video Chart on YouTube. Ren was invited to play at Glastonbury 2023, film festivals, and other major UK summer music festivals.

Life and career

1990–2013: Early life and Trick The Fox 
Ren Erin Gill was born on 29 March 1990 in Bangor, Gwynedd, Wales.

While studying music performance at Bath Spa University, Ren started a duo called Trick The Fox. He was discovered by a talent scout in 2009, when the two were busking. and in 2010, he signed a record deal with Sony Records.  In 2013, Trick The Fox was listed as one of the acts performing at Beach Break Live 2013 and their music began to receive airplay. The first time they heard one of their songs on the radio was 2 December 2013, when BBC Radio 1xtra played their song Twista. 

Sony Records later dropped Ren when he was diagnosed with an illness that affected his ability to perform.

2016-present: Freckled Angels
Ren decided to call his debut album, Freckled Angels. The album and the title track are dedicated to one of Ren's best friends, Joe Hughes, who died in 2010. It was officially released on 2 January 2016. It contained 16 tracks and was self released. A restaurant in Menai Bridge, Anglesey named itself for this album. On 15 February 2016 Ren released his first official single, Jessica.

Ren was featured in the 2017 movie Unrest and his song Patience was part of the soundtrack. He became widely acclaimed after his self released video for his song "Hi Ren" received over 5 million views in one month. He was named as one Atwood Magazine's 2023 Artists to Watch and the music critic, Gareth Branwyn, called the music "intense," and "refreshingly unique".

Personal life
Ren had been battling health issues since he was 19. In 2013 he made an announcement on the band's Facebook and Twitter account announcing Trick the Fox would be disbanding. He was diagnosed with M.E. and later was diagnosed with Lyme's disease.

Discography
Albums

 Freckled Angels (2016)
 Demos (Do Not Share), Vol 1 (2020)
 Demos, Vol 2 (2020)

References

External links

1990 births
Living people
21st-century Welsh male singers